Thomas Francis Markham (March 22, 1891 – June 9, 1952) was a Roman Catholic bishop.

Born in Lowell, Massachusetts, Markham was ordained to the priesthood on June 2, 1917, for the Roman Catholic Archdiocese of Boston. Markham was appointed titular bishop of Acalissus and auxiliary bishop of the Boston Archdiocese on July 18, 1950, and was ordained on September 14, 1950.

Notes

1891 births
1952 deaths
People from Lowell, Massachusetts
20th-century American Roman Catholic titular bishops
Roman Catholic Archdiocese of Boston
Religious leaders from Massachusetts
Catholics from Massachusetts